Flanders is the country of the Flemings; since several decades ago, it is also a community and a region in Belgium. Geographically and historically, Flanders also covers parts of France and The Netherlands but may also refer to:

Places

Americas 
 Flanders, Louisiana, USA
 Flanders, Michigan, USA
 Flanders, New Jersey, USA
 Flanders, New York, USA
 Flanders, a village in the town of East Lyme, Connecticut, USA
 Flanders, a village in Litchfield County, Connecticut, USA
 Indian Flanders (Flandes Indiano), an old name for Chile given during the Arauco War

Europe 
 Flanders, a townland in County Londonderry, Northern Ireland
 County of Flanders, a historical county of the Low Countries, which included part of the north of modern-day France and the extreme south-west of the modern Netherlands
 East Flanders, a province of Flanders, one of the three regions of modern-day Belgium
 Flanders Fields, the battlefields of World War I in northern France and north-western Belgium
 Flemish Community, one of the three Communities of Belgium, called Flanders
 Flemish Region, one of the three Regions of Belgium, called Flanders
 French Flanders, the northern département of Nord and part of the region of Nord-Pas-de-Calais
 West Flanders, the westernmost province of the Flemish Region, also named Flanders, in modern-day Belgium
 Zeelandic Flanders in The Netherlands

People

Raúl Hernández Barrón, Mexican suspected drug lord, nicknamed "Flanders 1"

Arts, entertainment, and media

Literature
 "In Flanders Fields", a 1915 World War I poem by Lt-Col John McCrae
 In Flanders Fields: The 1917 Campaign, a book by historian Leon Wolff
 Moll Flanders, a 1722 novel by Daniel Defoe

Other uses in arts, entertainment, and media
 Flanders (band), a.k.a. Deflect, an Italian electronic/dance group
 Flanders (film), by French filmmaker Bruno Dumont
 Flandre Scarlet, a vampire from the Touhou Project game series
Ned Flanders, a character from The Simpsons franchise

Other uses 
 Flanders Automobile Company, a US-American automobile manufacturer that operated in Detroit from 1910 to 1913
 Flanders (horse), an American racehorse
 Flanders, a common fig cultivar
 , a ferry in service under this name in 2002